Crassinella lunulata, or the lunate crassinella, is a species of very small bivalve mollusc in the family Crassatellidae. It can be found along the Atlantic coast of North America, ranging from Massachusetts to Texas.

References

Crassatellidae